Dimitrie I.  Ghika or Ghica (21 January 1875 – 13 October 1967) was a Romanian politician and diplomat. He was the son of Ioan Grigore Ghika former minister of National Defence and of Foreign Affairs.

Dimitrie Ghika studied at the University of Toulouse and at the Paris Institute of Political Studies. He entered the diplomatic service in 1894 as secretary to the Romanian legation in Rome. His other assignments took him to St. Petersburg, Bern, Vienna and Sofia.

In 1919 he was part of the Romanian delegation to the Paris Peace Conference, 1919 signing the Treaty of Sèvres. He thereafter worked closely with Nicolae Titulescu.  He was Minister of Foreign Affairs from April 27, 1931 to June 5, 1932 in the government headed by Nicolae Iorga. He was appointed minister plenipotentiary to Belgium and Luxembourg, being recalled in 1936 due to the reshuffling of the Romanian diplomatic corps after the dismissal of  Nicolae Titulescu. Dimitrie I. Ghika retired in 1937.

He was brother of Vladimir Ghika.

Dimitrie Ghika also translated the Histories of Herodotus into Romanian. He also published a study on the relations between France and the Romanian Principalities during the French Revolution and the First French Empire.

Works 
 Istoriile lui Erodot. Traducere română din limba originală însoţite de textul elinesc şi de note - 1894
 Franţa şi principatele Dunărene – 1789-1815 (republished Institutul European, 2008 - ]

Notes

References 
 The Treaty of Sèvres, 1920 
 Potra, George G. - Reacţii necunoscute la demiterea lui Titulescu 29 August 1936: O "mazilire perfidă" - Magazin Istoric, 1998, Nr. 6
 Mihai Sorin Radulescu - O scrisoare de la diplomatul Dimitrie I. Ghika 
 Principele Dimitrie I. Ghica

See also 
Foreign relations of Romania
Ghica family

Romanian diplomats
1875 births
Romanian Ministers of Foreign Affairs
1967 deaths